Gilardino is an Italian surname. Notable people with the surname include:

Alberto Gilardino (born 1982), Italian footballer
Angelo Gilardino (1941–2022), Italian composer, guitarist, and musicologist

Italian-language surnames